The following is a summary of the Taurus Records albums. Taurus is a Norwegian record label with records published by the parent label Gemini Records.

References 

Discographies of Norwegian record labels